Bocot Island (variously Bocot Islet) is a small island in northeastern Iloilo, Philippines. It is part of the municipality of  Concepcion.

Location and geography
Bocot Island is east of Panay Island in the Visayan Sea. Part of the Concepcion Islands, Bocot is northeast of Pan de Azucar Island.

See also 

 List of islands in the Philippines

References

External links
 Bocot Island at OpenStreetMap

Islands of Iloilo